Gloria Hooper (born 3 March 1992) is an Italian sprinter who won a silver medal at the 2018 Mediterranean Games. She won seven times the national championships.  She competed at the 2020 Summer Olympics, in 200 m.

Biography

Born in Villafranca di Verona, her parents arrived in Italy from Ghana in Naples in 1985.

National records
 4 × 100 m relay: 42.90 ( Doha, 4 October 2019), she ran second leg in the team with Johanelis Herrera, Anna Bongiorni, Irene Siragusa – current holder

Personal bests
 100 metres: 11.24 +1.5 ( Rieti, 22 May 2021)
 200 metres: 22.89 +1.4 ( Rieti, 26 June 2016)

Achievements

National titles
Italian Athletics Championships
100 metres: 2013, 2015, 2016 (3)
200 metres: 2014, 2016, 2017, 2019 (4)

See also
 2020 in 100 metres
 Italian all-time lists – 100 metres
 Italian all-time lists – 200 metres
 Italian all-time lists – 4 × 100 metres relay
 Italy at the 2012 European Athletics Championships

References

External links

1992 births
Italian female sprinters
Living people
Athletes (track and field) at the 2012 Summer Olympics
Athletes (track and field) at the 2016 Summer Olympics
Olympic athletes of Italy
People from Villafranca di Verona
Italian people of Ghanaian descent
Italian sportspeople of African descent
Athletics competitors of Gruppo Sportivo Forestale
Naturalised citizens of Italy
World Athletics Championships athletes for Italy
Athletics competitors of Centro Sportivo Carabinieri
Athletes (track and field) at the 2018 Mediterranean Games
Mediterranean Games silver medalists for Italy
Mediterranean Games medalists in athletics
Italian Athletics Championships winners
Athletes (track and field) at the 2020 Summer Olympics
Olympic female sprinters
Sportspeople from the Province of Verona
Athletes (track and field) at the 2022 Mediterranean Games
European Athletics Championships medalists
21st-century Italian women